State Route 315 (SR 315) is a  east-west state highway in the west-central part of the U.S. state of Georgia. The highway travels from SR 219 at Goat Rock Road in southwestern Harris County to SR 208 in Olive Branch, west of Talbotton, in west-central Talbot County.

Route description
SR 315 begins at an intersection with SR 219 in Piney Grove, in rural southwestern Harris County. At this intersection, the roadway continues to the southwest as Goat Rock Road. SR 315 travels to the northeast and immediately curves to the north-northeast. It curves back to the northeast to an interchange with Interstate 185 (I-185; Chet Atkins Parkway). The route then gradually curves to a roughly eastward direction, traveling through Mulberry Grove. After that, it curves to the south, to a very brief concurrency with US 27/SR 1 in Cataula. East of town, at the intersection with the southern terminus of Lynn Drive and the southwestern terminus of Denney Road, next to Clowers Cemetery, SR 315 turns right and travels to the south-southeast. Southwest of Ellerslie, the highway intersects the northern terminus of Old Warm Springs Road. It curves to the northeast and then to the east-southeast and intersects US 27 Alt./SR 85 (Manchester Expressway). The three highways travel concurrently to the north-northeast and enter Ellerslie. At the intersection with Talbotton Road, the highway turns right, to the southeast, and very gradually curves to the northeast, and traveling through Ridgeway, before it enters Talbot County. There, it travels through Baughville, before meeting its eastern terminus, an intersection with SR 208 (Tuck Persons Highway) in Olive Branch, west of Talbotton.

The only segment of SR 315 that is part of the National Highway System, a system of roadways important to the nation's economy, defense, and mobility, is the part that is concurrent with US 27/SR 1 in Cataula.

History

Major intersections

See also

References

External links
 

315
Transportation in Harris County, Georgia
Transportation in Talbot County, Georgia